The Cardiff-Newport metropolitan area is a metropolitan area in South East Wales in the Gwent and South Glamorgan counties of Wales, United Kingdom. The metropolitan area includes the cities of Cardiff and Newport, along with a number of towns in the South Wales Valleys, including Merthyr Tydfil, Pontypridd, Caerphilly, Bridgend and Ebbw Vale. With these outlying settlements the metropolitan area has a population of 1.09 million.

The area is also referred as the "Cardiff and South Wales Valley metropolitan area". The area forms the largest metropolitan area in Wales with the next largest being centred on Swansea Urban Area.

Cardiff is the official capital of Wales since 1955 and has been a city since 1905. The other city in the area, Newport, only became one in 2002. The towns of Bridgend, Caerphilly, Ebbw Vale, Merthyr Tydfil and Pontypridd grew rapidly during the industrial revolution with industry focused on ironmaking and coal mining whilst the cities of Newport and Cardiff grew on the backs of the shipping industry.

See also
 ESPON metropolitan areas in the United Kingdom
 South East Wales
 Cardiff Capital Region

References

Geography of Cardiff
Newport, Wales